Pablo Ezequiel Jerez (born 26 July 1984 in Morón) is a retired Argentine football player who played as a right-back.

Club career
Jerez started his professional career in 2003 with Boca Juniors, he won 4 titles during his two years in the Boca Juniors first team.

In 2005, Jerez left Boca to join Colón de Santa Fe, where he played until 2008. He subsequently transferred to Tigre. After a year playing in Victoria, he returned to Colón for the 2009 Apertura tournament. Jerez joined recently promoted Olimpo de Bahía Blanca for the 2010–11 Argentine Primera División season.

After retirement
After retiring in the summer 2019, Jerez returned to Boca Juniors. His specific task would be to organize and restructure the women's football , acting as a link between the management and the team. As of August 2021, he was still working with women's football at Boca.

Honours

References

External links
 Argentine Primera statistics
 Pablo Jerez at BDFA

1984 births
Living people
People from Morón Partido
Argentine footballers
Association football defenders
Boca Juniors footballers
Club Atlético Colón footballers
Club Atlético Tigre footballers
Club Atlético Huracán footballers
Olimpo footballers
San Martín de Burzaco footballers
Deportivo Merlo footballers
Club Ferrocarril Midland players
Argentine Primera División players
Sportspeople from Buenos Aires Province